Yehoshua may refer to:

 Book of Joshua, a book of the Bible
 Yehoshua (surname), a Hebrew surname
 Yehoshua (given name), a list of people

See also
 Jesus (name), an Anglicised version of the same Hebrew given name, as in Hebrews 4.8 referring to Jehoshua son of Nun, in the King James Version
 Joshua (name), a Hebrew given name
 Yeshua, a shortened version of this name, found in Nehemiah 8.17